In enzymology, a formate dehydrogenase (cytochrome) is an enzyme that catalyzes the chemical reaction

formate + 2 ferricytochrome b1  CO2 + 2 ferrocytochrome b1 + 2 H+

Thus, the two substrates of this enzyme are formate and ferricytochrome b1, whereas its 3 products are CO2, ferrocytochrome b1, and H+.

This enzyme belongs to the family of oxidoreductases, specifically those acting on the aldehyde or oxo group of donor with a cytochrome as acceptor.  The systematic name of this enzyme class is formate:ferricytochrome-b1 oxidoreductase. Other names in common use include formate dehydrogenase, and formate:cytochrome b1 oxidoreductase.  This enzyme participates in glyoxylate and dicarboxylate metabolism.

References

 

EC 1.2.2
Enzymes of unknown structure